Thomas Hodges Mate (5 April 1810 – 22 July 1894) was an English-born Australian politician.

He was born at Canterbury, the son of Thomas Mate. He migrated to Sydney in 1833 and acquired a sheep and cattle farm on Tarcutta Creek. On 8 February 1836 he married Maria Bardwell, with whom he had seven children; a second marriage in 1882 to Florence Brown would produce a further daughter. In 1850 he settled in Albury, where he established a general store and later served as mayor and alderman. In 1860 he was elected to the New South Wales Legislative Assembly for Hume, serving until his retirement in 1869. Mate died at Manly in 1894.

References

 

1810 births
1894 deaths
Members of the New South Wales Legislative Assembly
19th-century Australian politicians